Johann Esaias von Seidel (28 April 1758 – 20 November 1827) was a printer, publisher and publicist in the 19th century who promoted the reforms of Maximilian von Montgelas. He also promoted ecumenism, the concept of unity among different Christian denominations.

Life and career

Origin and childhood 
Seidel was born in Ortenburg, Bavaria, on 28 April 1758. He was the fourth of eight children of the Protestant pastor Georg Stephan Alexander Seidel and his wife Anna Margarete (née Faust). As early as 1766, Seidel moved from Ortenburg to Sulzbach to join his uncle, Georg Abraham Lorenz Lichtenthaler (1711-1780), at his printshop. He was the fourth generation to run the oldest of four publishing houses there (founded in 1664).

Seidel as a printer and publisher 

In 1821, he was raised to hereditary nobility. He died on 20 November 1827. Contemporaries (such as the publisher Friedrich Christoph Perthes in 1823) praised Seidel's extraordinary business acumen, which was always coupled with a comprehensive sense of social responsibility. In 1822, for example, he took in the Hebrew printing house that had been affected by a fire in the city, even though doing so caused him capacity bottlenecks.

Seidel died in Sulzbach at the age of 69.

Intellectual-historical significance

Promoter of the Bavarian reforms 
Like the Prussian Reform Movement in Prussia, Maximilian von Montgelas, supported by the Barons of Aretin, Seidel pushed for administrative modernisation in Bavaria. Seidel had a relationship of trust with Count Montgelas, so that the official publications of the Bavarian government were published by his publishing house. Its task was to place the former grievances in State and public life in clear contrast to Montgelas' reforms.

The monthly journal Allemania, which Johann Georg's younger brother  published from 1815 to 1816, turned against the romantic nationalism, especially as espoused by Ernst Moritz Arndt and Johann Gottlieb Fichte and opposed it with the enlightened spirit of the Bavarian state reformers.

Patrons of the Irenics 
Seidel's significance for South German intellectual culture around 1800 lies in his consistently irenic attitude. Today, Irenicism would be understood as ecumenism. Seidel mediated not only between Protestantism and Catholicism, but also between Enlightenment and Romanticism, North and South Germany. As a pioneer of ecumenism, he built up an interdenominational Bible institute with great commitment. Here, from 1810 onwards, a common Bible edition for Catholics, Lutherans and Reformed was published for the first time with royal Bavarian privilege.

Although Seidel himself was Protestant, his company became one of the most important publishers for Southern German Catholicism in the 19th century.

Saving Sulzbach Castle 
He thus saved the castle from decay. On the Schlossberg he had elaborate terraced gardens laid out and a "Pantheon" with 18 portrait busts of important scholars, churchmen and statesmen erected. The sculptor Joseph Kirchmayer was involved in both projects. Among other things, he created a life-size Minerva statue made of lead for Sulzbach, which is considered a prime example of the newer Bavarian metal casting and today adorns the backyard in front of the Seidel Hall.

Historical printing house J. E. v. Seidel 

After Seidel's death in 1827, his sons initially succeeded him, then sold in 1854 to Friedrich Pustet from Regensburg. Pustet sold the castle in 1862 and moved into smaller rooms on Sulzbach's Luitpoldplatz. In 1877, Pustet handed over the company to Dietrich Wotschack, who had already been an authorised signatory of the company since 1848. His great-grandson Ingo Wotschack continued to run the "J. E. v. Seidel'sche Buchhandlung" in Sulzbach-Rosenberg (after the printing business ceased in 1976) until his death in 2006.

As late as 2006, an intensive academic inventory and investigation of the extensive, nationally significant estate began, which includes the publisher's archive and the publisher's library from the 17th to the 20th century. The first results were published in 2008. The discovery of the picture story "Der Kuchenteig" by Wilhelm Busch was considered a "sensational find", which represents a previously unknown preliminary study for Max und Moritz. This was published in 2010 by Suhrkamp Verlag in the series  as IB 1325. The further indexing of the estate, in which some four and a half thousand hours of voluntary work have been invested so far, is ongoing.

The expansion of the rooms of the Seidel printing house into an exhibition centre and event hall started in 2010 and completed in April 2011 with a ceremonial opening as the Seidel Hall. Funding was provided by LEADER programme funds, donations and voluntary contributions from the townspeople. In the meantime, the Seidel Hall has established itself as a venue for events in addition to those organised by the Friends, especially for events organised by the Kulturwerkstatt Sulzbach-Rosenberg.

A tangent piano in its original condition was discovered in the estate. It was presented to the public in 2012 after extensive restoration during a concert.

Further reading 
 Markus Lommer (ed.): Johann Esaias von Seidel (1758–1827): Zum 250. Geburtstag eines bayerischen Verlegers. Sulzbach-Rosenberg 2008, .
 Volker Wappmann: Sulzbach als Druck- und Verlagsort. In Elisabeth Vogl, Johannes Hartmann (ed.): Eisenerz und Morgenglanz. Amberg 1999, .
 Klaus Engelmann: Literatur und Publizistik in Sulzbach zur Zeit der Aufklärung. In Elisabeth Vogl, Johannes Hartmann (ed.): Eisenerz und Morgenglanz. Amberg 1999, .
  (ed.): Der Kuchenteig. Insel-Verlag, Frankfurt und Leipzig 2010, .
 Sepp Lösch: Die Persönlichkeit J.E. v. Seidels. Aufsatz in Festschrift zur 950 Jahrfeier der Stadt Sulzbach-Rosenberg, Sulzbach-Rosenberg 1976
 : Kommerz und Konfession – Zum Programm des Sulzbacher Verlegers Johann Esaias (von) Seidel 1758–1827. veröffentlicht in Verein Literaturarchiv e.V.: Eröffnung des Archivs und der J. E. von Seidel-Ausstellung (Wiederentdeckung eines großen Verlegers) 4.-27. November 1977. Sulzbach-Rosenberg 1977

References

External links 
 

18th-century publishers (people)
19th-century publishers (people)
1758 births
1827 deaths
People from Passau (district)